Fiachra McArdle (born 18 August 1983 in Dundalk) is a professional footballer in the League of Ireland.

The midfield player joined English outfit Derby County F.C. as a 15-year-old in 1998. He progressed through the club's academy and won a reserve Premier League medal in 2001. He was promoted to Derby's first team squad, however he failed to make an appearance, returning home in 2002.

On his return to Ireland he was signed by then Shamrock Rovers manager Liam Buckley and played for Rovers in the Eircom Premier league before suffering a bad knee injury. He made a total of nine appearances. His debut was at Bray on 10 May 2004 in a League Cup clash. His 
League of Ireland debut was against Drogheda United on 4 June.

McArdle linked up with hometown club Dundalk F.C. and had two spells there sandwiched by a six-month spell at Athlone Town F.C. McArdle represented Ireland at U18, U19 and at U21 level and was part of the squad which competed in the Japan Cup in 2001.

McArdle made only 17 appearances for Kildare County during the 2007 season due to a broken collarbone which he sustained in his first match for the club against midland Athlone Town F.C. McArdle signed a new contract with Kildare County during the 2007 close season keeping him at the club for the 2008 season. However, he still departed the club for Sporting Fingal just before the 2008 season. In 2009 McArdle helped Sporting Fingal to win the FAI cup and promotion to the Premier Division of the League of Ireland.

McArdle joined his sixth League of Ireland club, Longford Town, in January 2010. McArdle then moved to Australia with Perth-based club Western Knights. There McArdle won the Western Australia National Premier League with the Knights  2010. He then moved to Melbourne side Sunshine George Cross FC in 2011 before returning to the UK to complete his studies.

McArdle resurfaced with Rymans South club Redhill FC in 2014.

He is currently playing in the Kent County Football League Division 1 West with South East Athletic.

Honours
FAI Cup:
 Sporting Fingal - 2009

References

1983 births
Living people
Derby County F.C. players
Shamrock Rovers F.C. players
Dundalk F.C. players
Athlone Town A.F.C. players
Kildare County F.C. players
Sporting Fingal F.C. players
Longford Town F.C. players
League of Ireland players
Republic of Ireland association footballers
Republic of Ireland youth international footballers
Republic of Ireland under-21 international footballers
Association footballers from County Louth
Association football midfielders